James William Rant CB QC (16 April 1936 – 25 May 2003) was a British judge and the Judge Advocate General from 1991 until his death in 2003.

Early life and education
Rant was born on 16 April 1936 in the Romford district of Essex and was educated at the Stowe School and Selwyn College, Cambridge. He graduated from Selwyn College in 1958 and was called to the bar by Gray's Inn in 1961.

Career
Rant practised general law until 1970, when he began to specialise in criminal law.  He became a QC in 1980 and by 1984 had become a circuit judge, sitting at the Old Bailey from 1986.

In 1991, he was appointed the Judge Advocate General, the first for a long time without a background or connection to the military. He made reforms to the court-martial system, including a centralised administration system for Army and Royal Air Force courts-martial and the introduction of judge advocates. He further reformed the system to reflect the introduction of the Human Rights Act including the creation of summary appeal courts.

Rant was appointed a Companion of the Order of the Bath in the 1995 Birthday Honours.

Personal life
Rant married in 1963 and had two daughters and two sons. He died on 25 May 2003, aged 67.

References

1936 births
2003 deaths
21st-century English judges
English King's Counsel
People educated at Stowe School
Alumni of Selwyn College, Cambridge
Companions of the Order of the Bath
20th-century English judges